Kirsten Bruhn (born 3 November 1969 in Eutin) is a former German female Paralympic swimmer. She learnt to swim when she was three. She began competing at ten before an accident in 1991. She was hurt during a holiday motorcycle trip on the island of Kos leaving her partially paralysed. She has since become an expert in social insurance.

She has won several medals at the 2004 Summer Paralympics and the 2008 Summer Paralympics.

References

External links 
 

1969 births
Living people
German female backstroke swimmers
German female breaststroke swimmers
German female freestyle swimmers
Paralympic swimmers of Germany
Paralympic medalists in swimming
Paralympic gold medalists for Germany
Paralympic silver medalists for Germany
Paralympic bronze medalists for Germany
Swimmers at the 2004 Summer Paralympics
Swimmers at the 2008 Summer Paralympics
Swimmers at the 2012 Summer Paralympics
Medalists at the 2004 Summer Paralympics
Medalists at the 2008 Summer Paralympics
Medalists at the 2012 Summer Paralympics
Recipients of the Silver Laurel Leaf
People from Eutin
S7-classified Paralympic swimmers
Sportspeople from Schleswig-Holstein
20th-century German women
21st-century German women